Hương Khê is a rural district (huyện) of Hà Tĩnh province in the North Central Coast region of Vietnam.

As of 2003 the district had a population of 105,975. The district capital lies at Hương Khê.

References

Districts of Hà Tĩnh province